The 1984–85 DDR-Oberliga season was the 37th season of the DDR-Oberliga, the top level of ice hockey in East Germany. Two teams participated in the league, and SC Dynamo Berlin won the championship.

Game results

Dynamo Berlin wins series 12:8 in points

References

External links
East German results 1970-1990

1989-90
Ger
Oberliga
1984 in East German sport
1985 in East German sport